Megalodontes  is a genus of sawflies within the Symphyta belonging to the family Megalodontesidae subfamily Megalodontesinae.

Description
Megalodontes species are quite rare sawflies with a shiny black body and narrow pale yellow stripes on the abdomen. The head is large, the antennae are pectinate and the wings are reddish. These species are restricted to the temperate regions of Eurasia.

Species
 Megalodontes bucephalus (Klug, 1824)
 Megalodontes capitalatus Konow, 1904
 Megalodontes cephalotes (Fabricius, 1781)
 Megalodontes dusmeti Enslin, 1914
 Megalodontes eversmanni (Freymuth, 1870)
 Megalodontes fabricii (Leach, 1817)
 Megalodontes flabellicornis (Germar, 1825)
 Megalodontes flavicornis (Klug, 1824)
 Megalodontes gratiosus (Mocsáry, 1881)
 Megalodontes krausi Taeger, 1998
 Megalodontes laticeps Konow, 1897
 Megalodontes medius Konow, 1897
 Megalodontes merceti Konow, 1904
 Megalodontes mocsaryi (Ed. André, 1881)
 Megalodontes mundus Konow, 1904
 Megalodontes panzeri (Leach, 1817)
 Megalodontes phaenicius (Lepeletier, 1823)
 Megalodontes plagiocephalus (Fabricius, 1804)
 Megalodontes scythicus Zhelochovtsev, 1988
 Megalodontes spiraeae (Klug, 1824)
 Megalodontes thor Taeger, 2002
 Megalodontes turcicus (Mocsáry, 1881)

References 

 Biolib
 Naturspaziergang
 Aramel.free.fr
 R.B. Benson: Handbook for the identification of British insects. Vol IV: Hymenoptera. 2. Symphyta Section a. Published by the Royal Entomological Society of London, 1951.

Sawfly genera
Sawflies
Taxa named by Pierre André Latreille